Moissaye Marans (October 11, 1902 – 1977) was an American sculptor.

Life
Marans immigrated in 1924.
He was a member of the Federal Art Project.
He taught at Brooklyn College.

His sculpture Isaiah is located at the Community Church in New York City. His sculpture of Carl Linnaeus is located in the Brooklyn Botanic Garden.
He work is held by the San Jose Museum of Art, and Smithsonian American Art Museum.
His papers are held by Syracuse University, and the Archives of American Art.

References

External links
Moissaye Marans at the Smithsonian and Renwick
Life, June 6, 1955

Artists from New York City
Emigrants from the Russian Empire to the United States
Artists from Chișinău
1902 births
1977 deaths
Federal Art Project artists
Brooklyn College faculty
20th-century American sculptors
20th-century American male artists
American male sculptors
Sculptors from New York (state)